Sadeq Abad (also Romanized as Şādeqābād) is a city in Galikash County, Golestan Province, Iran. At the 2006 census, its population was 1,617, in 404 families.

References 

Populated places in Galikash County